Maggiacomo is an Italian surname. Notable people with the surname include:

Anthony Maggiacomo (born 1984), Canadian football player
Jocko Maggiacomo (born 1947), American racing driver
Matty Maggiacomo, American fitness instructor

Surnames of Italian origin